Newark Valley Municipal Building and Tappan-Spaulding Memorial Library is a historic municipal building and library building located at Newark Valley in Tioga County, New York. The municipal building is a -story brick building with a cut stone foundation and full basement built in 1887 as the Union Free School and Academy.  A 2-story, 45-foot rear wing was completed in 1904, and the building was altered for its current use in 1931.  The library building was constructed in 1908 and is a small 1-story brick building in a cruciform plan. The roof features red terra cotta tiles and is crowned with a three-stage tower with a steep pyramidal roof.

It was listed on the National Register of Historic Places in 2006.

Gallery

References

School buildings completed in 1887
Libraries on the National Register of Historic Places in New York (state)
City and town halls on the National Register of Historic Places in New York (state)
Buildings and structures in Tioga County, New York
National Register of Historic Places in Tioga County, New York
Public libraries in New York (state)